Spigelia marilandica, the Indian pink or woodland pinkroot, is a herbacious perennial wildflower in the Loganiaceae family native to inland areas of the Southeastern and Midwestern United States.

It flowers in late spring and early summer and tends to be found in low moist woods, ravines, or stream banks in partial or full shade. The flowers are red, erect, tubes with a star-shaped yellow center at the tip.
 

It is used as an ornamental plant, more popular in the UK and Europe than its native U.S.

Its dried roots are used as an anthelmintic (dewormer), and are followed by a saline aperient to avoid unpleasant side effects and ensure that the toxic ensure root is expelled along with the worms.  The roots are also a narcotic hallucinogen, but the alkaloid spigiline, which is largely responsible for both its hallucinogenic and medicinal action, can cause increased heart action, vertigo, convulsions and death if overdosed.

References

External links
Spigelia marilandica at Missouri Plants website with extensive photos

Loganiaceae
Flora of the United States
Plants described in 1753
Taxa named by Carl Linnaeus